The 108th United States Congress was a meeting of the legislative branch of the United States federal government, composed of the United States Senate and the United States House of Representatives from January 3, 2003 to January 3, 2005, during the third and fourth years of George W. Bush's presidency.

House members were elected in the 2002 general election on November 5, 2002. Senators were elected in three classes in the 1998 general election on November 3, 1998, 2000 general election on November 7, 2000, or 2002 general election on November 5, 2002. The apportionment of seats in the House of Representatives was based on the 2000 United States census.

This is the most recent Congress to have a Democratic senator from South Carolina, Fritz Hollings, who retired at the end of the Congress.

Both chambers had a Republican majority, with the Republicans slightly increasing their edge in the House, and regaining control of the Senate, after party control had switched back and forth during the 107th Congress due to various factors.  With President Bush, this gave the Republicans an overall federal government trifecta.

Major events

 February 1, 2003: Space Shuttle Columbia disintegrated during reentry
 March 20, 2003: 2003 invasion of Iraq began
 April 14, 2003: Human Genome Project was completed
 July 14, 2003: CIA leak scandal began
 May 17, 2004: Same-sex marriage began in Massachusetts
 July 22, 2004: 9/11 Commission issued an initial report of its findings
 September 13, 2004: expiration of the Federal Assault Weapons Ban
 November 2, 2004:
 2004 United States presidential election: George W. Bush defeated Democratic challenger, Senator John Kerry from Massachusetts.
 United States Senate elections, 2004 & United States House of Representatives elections, 2004: Republicans increased their majorities in both houses.

Major legislation

Enacted

 March 11, 2003: Do-Not-Call Implementation Act of 2003, 
 April 25, 2003: Clean Diamond Trade Act, Pub.L. 108-19
 April 30, 2003: PROTECT (Prosecutorial Remedies and Other Tools to end the Exploitation of Children Today) Act, including Illicit Drug Anti-Proliferation Act, 
 May 27, 2003: United States Leadership Against HIV/AIDS, Tuberculosis, and Malaria Act of 2003, Pub.L. 108-25
 May 28, 2003: Jobs and Growth Tax Relief Reconciliation Act of 2003, 
 May 29, 2003: Veterans' Memorial Preservation and Recognition Act of 2003, Pub.L. 108-29
 June 25, 2003: Keeping Children and Families Safe Act of 2003, Pub.L. 108-36
 September 4, 2003: Prison Rape Elimination Act of 2003, 
 October 1, 2003: Department of Homeland Security Appropriations Act, 2004, Pub.L. 108-90
 October 28, 2003: Check 21 Act, 
 November 5, 2003: Partial-Birth Abortion Ban Act, 
 December 3, 2003: Healthy Forests Restoration Act of 2003, Pub.L. 108-148
 December 3, 2003: 21st Century Nanotechnology Research and Development Act, Pub.L. 108-153
 December 4, 2003: Fair and Accurate Credit Transactions Act, 
 December 6, 2003: Fairness to Contact Lens Consumers Act, Pub.L. 108-164
 December 8, 2003: Medicare Prescription Drug, Improvement, and Modernization Act, 
 December 12, 2003:Syria Accountability and Lebanese Sovereignty Restoration Act, 
 December 16, 2003: CAN-SPAM Act, 
 March 25, 2004: Unborn Victims of Violence Act (Laci and Conner's Law), 
 June 30, 2004: Bunning-Bereuter-Blumenauer Flood Insurance Reform Act, 
 July 7, 2004: GAO Human Capital Reform Act of 2004, 
 July 21, 2004: Project BioShield Act of 2004, 
 October 18, 2004: North Korean Human Rights Act of 2004, 
 October 18, 2004: Department of Homeland Security Appropriations Act, 2005, Pub.L. 108-334
 October 20, 2004: Belarus Democracy Act of 2004, 
 October 22, 2004: American Jobs Creation Act of 2004, Pub.L. 108-357
 October 30, 3004: Crime Victims' Rights Act, Pub.L. 108-405
 December 3, 2004: Internet Tax Nondiscrimination Act, Pub.L. 108-435
 December 3, 2004: Individuals with Disabilities Education Improvement Act of 2004, Pub.L. 108-446
 December 8, 2004: Consolidated Appropriations Act, 2005, Pub.L. 108-447
 December 10, 2004: Alaska Land Transfer Acceleration Act, Pub.L. 108-452
 December 17, 2004: Intelligence Reform and Terrorism Prevention Act,

Proposed, but not enacted
 : Voter Confidence and Increased Accessibility Act of 2003

Party summary

Senate

The party summary for the Senate remained the same during the entire 108th Congress.

House of Representatives
Due to resignations and special elections, Republicans lost a net of two seats to the Democrats. All seats were filled though special elections. (See Changes in membership, below.)

Leadership

Senate 

 President: Dick Cheney (R)
 President pro tempore: Ted Stevens (R)

Majority (Republican) leadership 

 Majority Leader: Bill Frist
 Majority Whip: Mitch McConnell
 Republican Conference Chairman: Rick Santorum
 Republican Conference Secretary: Kay Bailey Hutchison
 Republican Campaign Committee Chairman: George Allen
 Policy Committee Chairman: Jon Kyl
Chief Deputy Whip: Bob Bennett

Minority (Democratic) leadership 

 Minority Leader: Tom Daschle
 Minority Whip: Harry Reid
 Policy Committee Chairman: Byron Dorgan
 Democratic Conference Secretary: Barbara Mikulski
 Democratic Campaign Committee Chairman: Jon Corzine
 Steering and Outreach Committee Chair: Hillary Clinton
 Chief Deputy Whip: John Breaux

House of Representatives 

 Speaker: Dennis Hastert (R)

Majority (Republican) leadership

 Majority Leader: Tom DeLay
 Majority Whip: Roy Blunt
 Chief Deputy Whip: Eric Cantor
 Republican Conference Chairman: Deborah Pryce
 Republican Conference Vice-Chairman: Jack Kingston
 Republican Conference Secretary: John T. Doolittle
 Policy Committee Chairman: Christopher Cox
 Republican Campaign Committee Chairman: Tom Reynolds
House Rules Committee Chairman: David Dreier

Minority (Democratic) leadership

 Minority Leader: Nancy Pelosi
 Minority Whip: Steny Hoyer
 Senior Chief Deputy Minority Whip: John Lewis
 Democratic Caucus Chairman: Bob Menendez
 Democratic Caucus Vice Chairman: Jim Clyburn
 Democratic Campaign Committee Chairman: Bob Matsui
 Chief Deputy Minority Whips: Joe Crowley, Baron Hill, Ron Kind, Ed Pastor, Max Sandlin, Jan Schakowsky, & Maxine Waters

Members

Senate
The Senators are preceded by the class, In this Congress, Class 3 meant their term ended with this Congress, requiring reelection in 2004; Class 1 meant their term began in the last Congress, requiring reelection in 2006; and Class 2 meant their term began in this Congress, requiring reelection in 2008.

Alabama
 2. Jeff Sessions (R)
 3. Richard Shelby (R)

Alaska
 2. Ted Stevens (R)
 3. Lisa Murkowski (R)

Arizona
 1. Jon Kyl (R)
 3. John McCain (R)

Arkansas
 2. Mark Pryor (D)
 3. Blanche Lincoln (D)

California
 1. Dianne Feinstein (D)
 3. Barbara Boxer (D)

Colorado
 2. Wayne Allard (R)
 3. Ben Nighthorse Campbell (R)

Connecticut
 1. Joe Lieberman (D)
 3. Chris Dodd (D)

Delaware
 1. Tom Carper (D)
 2. Joe Biden (D)

Florida
 1. Bill Nelson (D)
 3. Bob Graham (D)

Georgia
 2. Saxby Chambliss (R)
 3. Zell Miller (D)

Hawaii
 1. Daniel Akaka (D)
 3. Daniel Inouye (D)

Idaho
 2. Larry Craig (R)
 3. Mike Crapo (R)

Illinois
 2. Dick Durbin (D)
 3. Peter Fitzgerald (R)

Indiana
 1. Richard Lugar (R)
 3. Evan Bayh (D)

Iowa
 2. Tom Harkin (D)
 3. Chuck Grassley (R)

Kansas
 2. Pat Roberts (R)
 3. Sam Brownback (R)

Kentucky
 2. Mitch McConnell (R)
 3. Jim Bunning (R)

Louisiana
 2. Mary Landrieu (D)
 3. John Breaux (D)

Maine
 1. Olympia Snowe (R)
 2. Susan Collins (R)

Maryland
 1. Paul Sarbanes (D)
 3. Barbara Mikulski (D)

Massachusetts
 1. Ted Kennedy (D)
 2. John Kerry (D)

Michigan
 1. Debbie Stabenow (D)
 2. Carl Levin (D)

Minnesota
 1. Mark Dayton (DFL)
 2. Norm Coleman (R)

Mississippi
 1. Trent Lott (R)
 2. Thad Cochran (R)

Missouri
 1. James Talent (R)
 3. Kit Bond (R)

Montana
 1. Conrad Burns (R)
 2. Max Baucus (D)

Nebraska
 1. Ben Nelson (D)
 2. Chuck Hagel (R)

Nevada
 1. John Ensign (R)
 3. Harry Reid (D)

New Hampshire
 2. John E. Sununu (R)
 3. Judd Gregg (R)

New Jersey
 1. Jon Corzine (D)
 2. Frank Lautenberg (D)

New Mexico
 1. Jeff Bingaman (D)
 2. Pete Domenici (R)

New York
 1. Hillary Clinton (D)
 3. Chuck Schumer (D)

North Carolina
 2. Elizabeth Dole (R)
 3. John Edwards (D)

North Dakota
 1. Kent Conrad (D-NPL)
 3. Byron Dorgan (D-NPL)

Ohio
 1. Mike DeWine (R)
 3. George Voinovich (R)

Oklahoma
 2. Jim Inhofe (R)
 3. Don Nickles (R)

Oregon
 2. Gordon H. Smith (R)
 3. Ron Wyden (D)

Pennsylvania
 1. Rick Santorum (R)
 3. Arlen Specter (R)

Rhode Island
 1. Lincoln Chafee (R)
 2. Jack Reed (D)

South Carolina
 2. Lindsey Graham (R)
 3. Ernest Hollings (D)

South Dakota
 2. Tim Johnson (D)
 3. Tom Daschle (D)

Tennessee
 1. Bill Frist (R)
 2. Lamar Alexander (R)

Texas
 1. Kay Bailey Hutchison (R)
 2. John Cornyn (R)

Utah
 1. Orrin Hatch (R)
 3. Bob Bennett (R)

Vermont
 1. Jim Jeffords (I)
 3. Patrick Leahy (D)

Virginia
 1. George Allen (R)
 2. John Warner (R)

Washington
 1. Maria Cantwell (D)
 3. Patty Murray (D)

West Virginia
 1. Robert Byrd (D)
 2. Jay Rockefeller (D)

Wisconsin
 1. Herb Kohl (D)
 3. Russ Feingold (D)

Wyoming
 1. Craig L. Thomas (R)
 2. Mike Enzi (R)

House of Representatives

The Members of the House of Representatives are preceded by the district number.

Alabama 
 . Jo Bonner (R)
 . Terry Everett (R)
 . Mike Rogers (R)
 . Robert Aderholt (R)
 . Bud Cramer (D)
 . Spencer Bachus (R)
 . Artur Davis (D)

Alaska 
 . Don Young (R)

Arizona 
 . Rick Renzi (R)
 . Trent Franks (R)
 . John Shadegg (R)
 . Ed Pastor (D)
 . J. D. Hayworth (R)
 . Jeff Flake (R)
 . Raúl Grijalva (D)
 . Jim Kolbe (R)

Arkansas 
 . Marion Berry (D)
 . Vic Snyder (D)
 . John Boozman (R)
 . Mike Ross (D)

California 
 . Mike Thompson (D)
 . Wally Herger (R)
 . Doug Ose (R)
 . John Doolittle (R)
 . Robert Matsui (D), until January 1, 2005, vacant thereafter
 . Lynn Woolsey (D)
 . George Miller (D)
 . Nancy Pelosi (D)
 . Barbara Lee (D)
 . Ellen Tauscher (D)
 . Richard Pombo (R)
 . Tom Lantos (D)
 . Pete Stark (D)
 . Anna Eshoo (D)
 . Mike Honda (D)
 . Zoe Lofgren (D)
 . Sam Farr (D)
 . Dennis Cardoza (D)
 . George Radanovich (R)
 . Cal Dooley (D)
 . Devin Nunes (R)
 . Bill Thomas (R)
 . Lois Capps (D)
 . Elton Gallegly (R)
 . Howard McKeon (R)
 . David Dreier (R)
 . Brad Sherman (D)
 . Howard Berman (D)
 . Adam Schiff (D)
 . Henry Waxman (D)
 . Xavier Becerra (D)
 . Hilda Solis (D)
 . Diane Watson (D)
 . Lucille Roybal-Allard (D)
 . Maxine Waters (D)
 . Jane Harman (D)
 . Juanita Millender-McDonald (D)
 . Grace Napolitano (D)
 . Linda Sánchez (D)
 . Edward R. Royce (R)
 . Jerry Lewis (R)
 . Gary Miller (R)
 . Joe Baca (D)
 . Ken Calvert (R)
 . Mary Bono (R)
 . Dana Rohrabacher (R)
 . Loretta Sanchez (D)
 . Christopher Cox (R)
 . Darrell Issa (R)
 . Duke Cunningham (R)
 . Bob Filner (D)
 . Duncan Hunter (R)
 . Susan Davis (D)

Colorado 
 . Diana DeGette (D)
 . Mark Udall (D)
 . Scott McInnis (R)
 . Marilyn Musgrave (R)
 . Joel Hefley (R)
 . Tom Tancredo (R)
 . Bob Beauprez (R)

Connecticut 
 . John Larson (D)
 . Rob Simmons (R)
 . Rosa DeLauro (D)
 . Chris Shays (R)
 . Nancy Johnson (R)

Delaware 
 . Mike Castle (R)

Florida 
 . Jeff Miller (R)
 . Allen Boyd (D)
 . Corrine Brown (D)
 . Ander Crenshaw (R)
 . Ginny Brown-Waite (R)
 . Cliff Stearns (R)
 . John Mica (R)
 . Ric Keller (R)
 . Michael Bilirakis (R)
 . Bill Young (R)
 . Jim Davis (D)
 . Adam Putnam (R)
 . Katherine Harris (R)
 . Porter Goss (R), until September 24, 2004, vacant thereafter
 . Dave Weldon (R)
 . Mark Foley (R)
 . Kendrick Meek (D)
 . Ileana Ros-Lehtinen (R)
 . Robert Wexler (D)
 . Peter Deutsch (D)
 . Lincoln Diaz-Balart (R)
 . Clay Shaw (R)
 . Alcee Hastings (D)
 . Tom Feeney (R)
 . Mario Diaz-Balart (R)

Georgia 
 . Jack Kingston (R)
 . Sanford Bishop (D)
 . Jim Marshall (D)
 . Denise Majette (D)
 . John Lewis (D)
 . Johnny Isakson (R)
 . John Linder (R)
 . Mac Collins (R)
 . Charlie Norwood (R)
 . Nathan Deal (R)
 . Phil Gingrey (R)
 . Max Burns (R)
 . David Scott (D)

Hawaii 
 . Neil Abercrombie (D)
 . Ed Case (D), from January 4, 2003

Idaho 
 . Butch Otter (R)
 . Mike Simpson (R)

Illinois 
 . Bobby Rush (D)
 . Jesse Jackson Jr. (D)
 . William Lipinski (D)
 . Luis Gutiérrez (D)
 . Rahm Emanuel (D)
 . Henry Hyde (R)
 . Danny Davis (D)
 . Philip Crane (R)
 . Janice Schakowsky (D)
 . Mark Kirk (R)
 . Jerry Weller (R)
 . Jerry Costello (D)
 . Judy Biggert (R)
 . Dennis Hastert (R)
 . Tim Johnson (R)
 . Donald Manzullo (R)
 . Lane Evans (D)
 . Ray LaHood (R)
 . John Shimkus (R)

Indiana 
 . Pete Visclosky (D)
 . Chris Chocola (R)
 . Mark Souder (R)
 . Steve Buyer (R)
 . Dan Burton (R)
 . Mike Pence (R)
 . Julia Carson (D)
 . John Hostettler (R)
 . Baron Hill (D)

Iowa 
 . Jim Nussle (R)
 . Jim Leach (R)
 . Leonard Boswell (D)
 . Tom Latham (R)
 . Steve King (R)

Kansas 
 . Jerry Moran (R)
 . Jim Ryun (R)
 . Dennis Moore (D)
 . Todd Tiahrt (R)

Kentucky 
 . Ed Whitfield (R)
 . Ron Lewis (R)
 . Anne Northup (R)
 . Ken Lucas (D)
 . Hal Rogers (R)
 . Ernie Fletcher (R), until December 9, 2003
 Ben Chandler (D), from February 7, 2004

Louisiana 
 . David Vitter (R)
 . William Jefferson (D)
 . Billy Tauzin (R)
 . Jim McCrery (R)
 . Rodney Alexander (D, then R)
 . Richard Baker (R)
 . Christopher John (D)

Maine 
 . Tom Allen (D)
 . Mike Michaud (D)

Maryland 
 . Wayne Gilchrest (R)
 . Dutch Ruppersberger (D)
 . Ben Cardin (D)
 . Albert Wynn (D)
 . Steny Hoyer (D)
 . Roscoe Bartlett (R)
 . Elijah Cummings (D)
 . Chris Van Hollen (D)

Massachusetts 
 . John Olver (D)
 . Richard Neal (D)
 . Jim McGovern (D)
 . Barney Frank (D)
 . Marty Meehan (D)
 . John Tierney (D)
 . Ed Markey (D)
 . Mike Capuano (D)
 . Stephen Lynch (D)
 . Bill Delahunt (D)

Michigan 
 . Bart Stupak (D)
 . Peter Hoekstra (R)
 . Vern Ehlers (R)
 . David Lee Camp (R)
 . Dale Kildee (D)
 . Fred Upton (R)
 . Nick Smith (R)
 . Mike Rogers (R)
 . Joe Knollenberg (R)
 . Candice Miller (R)
 . Thaddeus McCotter (R)
 . Sander Levin (D)
 . Carolyn Cheeks Kilpatrick (D)
 . John Conyers (D)
 . John Dingell (D)

Minnesota 
 . Gil Gutknecht (R)
 . John Kline (R)
 . Jim Ramstad (R)
 . Betty McCollum (DFL)
 . Martin Olav Sabo (DFL)
 . Mark Kennedy (R)
 . Collin Peterson (DFL)
 . James Oberstar (DFL)

Mississippi 
 . Roger Wicker (R)
 . Bennie Thompson (D)
 . Chip Pickering (R)
 . Gene Taylor (D)

Missouri 
 . Lacy Clay (D)
 . Todd Akin (R)
 . Dick Gephardt (D)
 . Ike Skelton (D)
 . Karen McCarthy (D)
 . Sam Graves (R)
 . Roy Blunt (R)
 . Jo Ann Emerson (R)
 . Kenny Hulshof (R)

Montana 
 . Denny Rehberg (R)

Nebraska 
 . Doug Bereuter (R), until August 31, 2004, vacant thereafter
 . Lee Terry (R)
 . Tom Osborne (R)

Nevada 
 . Shelley Berkley (D)
 . Jim Gibbons (R)
 . Jon Porter (R)

New Hampshire 
 . Jeb Bradley (R)
 . Charlie Bass (R)

New Jersey 
 . Rob Andrews (D)
 . Frank LoBiondo (R)
 . Jim Saxton (R)
 . Chris Smith (R)
 . Scott Garrett (R)
 . Frank Pallone (D)
 . Mike Ferguson (R)
 . Bill Pascrell Jr. (D)
 . Steve Rothman (D)
 . Donald M. Payne (D)
 . Rodney Frelinghuysen (R)
 . Rush Holt Jr. (D)
 . Bob Menendez (D)

New Mexico 
 . Heather Wilson (R)
 . Steve Pearce (R)
 . Tom Udall (D)

New York 
 . Tim Bishop (D)
 . Steve Israel (D)
 . Peter King (R)
 . Carolyn McCarthy (D)
 . Gary Ackerman (D)
 . Gregory Meeks (D)
 . Joe Crowley (D)
 . Jerry Nadler (D)
 . Anthony Weiner (D)
 . Edolphus Towns (D)
 . Major Owens (D)
 . Nydia Velázquez (D)
 . Vito Fossella (R)
 . Carolyn Maloney (D)
 . Charles Rangel (D)
 . José E. Serrano (D)
 . Eliot Engel (D)
 . Nita Lowey (D)
 . Sue W. Kelly (R)
 . John E. Sweeney (R)
 . Michael McNulty (D)
 . Maurice Hinchey (D)
 . John M. McHugh (R)
 . Sherwood Boehlert (R)
 . James T. Walsh (R)
 . Thomas M. Reynolds (R)
 . Jack Quinn (R)
 . Louise Slaughter (D)
 . Amo Houghton (R)

North Carolina 
 . Frank Ballance (D), resigned June 9, 2004
 G. K. Butterfield (D), from July 20, 2004
 . Bob Etheridge (D)
 . Walter B. Jones Jr. (R)
 . David Price (D)
 . Richard Burr (R)
 . Howard Coble (R)
 . Mike McIntyre (D)
 . Robin Hayes (R)
 . Sue Myrick (R)
 . Cass Ballenger (R)
 . Charles H. Taylor (R)
 . Mel Watt (D)
 . Brad Miller (D)

North Dakota 
 . Earl Pomeroy (D-NPL)

Ohio 
 . Steve Chabot (R)
 . Rob Portman (R)
 . Mike Turner (R)
 . Mike Oxley (R)
 . Paul Gillmor (R)
 . Ted Strickland (D)
 . Dave Hobson (R)
 . John Boehner (R)
 . Marcy Kaptur (D)
 . Dennis Kucinich (D)
 . Stephanie Tubbs Jones (D)
 . Pat Tiberi (R)
 . Sherrod Brown (D)
 . Steve LaTourette (R)
 . Deborah Pryce (R)
 . Ralph Regula (R)
 . Tim Ryan (D)
 . Bob Ney (R)

Oklahoma 
 . John Sullivan (R)
 . Brad Carson (D)
 . Frank Lucas (R)
 . Tom Cole (R)
 . Ernest Istook (R)

Oregon 
 . David Wu (D)
 . Greg Walden (R)
 . Earl Blumenauer (D)
 . Peter DeFazio (D)
 . Darlene Hooley (D)

Pennsylvania 
 . Bob Brady (D)
 . Chaka Fattah (D)
 . Phil English (R)
 . Melissa Hart (R)
 . John Peterson (R)
 . Jim Gerlach (R)
 . Curt Weldon (R)
 . Jim Greenwood (R)
 . Bill Shuster (R)
 . Don Sherwood (R)
 . Paul Kanjorski (D)
 . John Murtha (D)
 . Joseph M. Hoeffel (D)
 . Mike Doyle (D)
 . Patrick Toomey (R)
 . Joseph R. Pitts (R)
 . Tim Holden (D)
 . Tim Murphy (R)
 . Todd Russell Platts (R)

Rhode Island 
 . Patrick J. Kennedy (D)
 . James Langevin (D)

South Carolina 
 . Henry Brown (R)
 . Joe Wilson (R)
 . Gresham Barrett (R)
 . Jim DeMint (R)
 . John Spratt (D)
 . Jim Clyburn (D)

South Dakota 
 . Bill Janklow (R), until January 20, 2004
 Stephanie Herseth (D), from June 1, 2004

Tennessee 
 . Bill Jenkins (R)
 . John Duncan (R)
 . Zach Wamp (R)
 . Lincoln Davis (D)
 . Jim Cooper (D)
 . Bart Gordon (D)
 . Marsha Blackburn (R)
 . John Tanner (D)
 . Harold Ford Jr. (D)

Texas 
 . Max Sandlin (D)
 . Jim Turner (D)
 . Sam Johnson (R)
 . Ralph Hall (D, then R)
 . Jeb Hensarling (R)
 . Joe Barton (R)
 . John Culberson (R)
 . Kevin Brady (R)
 . Nick Lampson (D)
 . Lloyd Doggett (D)
 . Chet Edwards (D)
 . Kay Granger (R)
 . Mac Thornberry (R)
 . Ron Paul (R)
 . Rubén Hinojosa (D)
 . Silvestre Reyes (D)
 . Charles Stenholm (D)
 . Sheila Jackson-Lee (D)
 . Larry Combest (R), until May 31, 2003
 Randy Neugebauer (R), from June 5, 2003
 . Charlie Gonzalez (D)
 . Lamar Smith (R)
 . Tom DeLay (R)
 . Henry Bonilla (R)
 . Martin Frost (D)
 . Chris Bell (D)
 . Michael C. Burgess (R)
 . Solomon P. Ortiz (D)
 . Ciro Rodriguez (D)
 . Gene Green (D)
 . Eddie Bernice Johnson (D)
 . John Carter (R)
 . Pete Sessions (R)

Utah 
 . Rob Bishop (R)
 . Jim Matheson (D)
 . Chris Cannon (R)

Vermont 
 . Bernie Sanders (I)

Virginia 
 . Jo Ann Davis (R)
 . Ed Schrock (R)
 . Bobby Scott (D)
 . Randy Forbes (R)
 . Virgil Goode (R)
 . Bob Goodlatte (R)
 . Eric Cantor (R)
 . Jim Moran (D)
 . Rick Boucher (D)
 . Frank Wolf (R)
 . Tom Davis (R)

Washington 
 . Jay Inslee (D)
 . Rick Larsen (D)
 . Brian Baird (D)
 . Doc Hastings (R)
 . George Nethercutt (R)
 . Norm Dicks (D)
 . Jim McDermott (D)
 . Jennifer Dunn (R)
 . Adam Smith (D)

West Virginia 
 . Alan Mollohan (D)
 . Shelley Moore Capito (R)
 . Nick Rahall (D)

Wisconsin 
 . Paul Ryan (R)
 . Tammy Baldwin (D)
 . Ron Kind (D)
 . Jerry Kleczka (D)
 . Jim Sensenbrenner (R)
 . Tom Petri (R)
 . Dave Obey (D)
 . Mark Green (R)

Wyoming 
 . Barbara Cubin (R)

Non-voting members 
 . Eni Faleomavaega (D)
 . Eleanor Holmes Norton (D)
 . Madeleine Bordallo (D)
 . Aníbal Acevedo Vilá (Resident Commissioner) (D/PPD)
 . Donna Christian-Christensen (D)

Changes in membership
Members who came and left during this Congress.

Senate
There were no changes in Senate membership during this Congress.

House of Representatives

|-
| 
|  | Ed Case (D)
| Member-elect Patsy Mink (D) died September 28, 2002 but was posthumously elected to the 108th Congress.Ed Case had won a special election for the seat in the 107th Congress November 30, 2002, but not for the 108th Congress.A special election was held January 4, 2003.
|  | Ed Case (D)
| January 4, 2003

|-
| 
|  | Larry Combest (R)
| Resigned May 31, 2003 for personal reasons.A special election was held June 3, 2003.
|  | Randy Neugebauer (R)
| June 5, 2003

|-
| 
|  | Ralph Hall (D)
| Changed political parties, with no interruption in his service.
|  | Ralph Hall (R)
| January 5, 2004

|-
| 
|  | Ernie Fletcher (R)
| Resigned December 9, 2003 to become Governor of Kentucky.A special election was held February 17, 2004
|  | Ben Chandler (D)
| February 17, 2004

|-
| 
|  | Bill Janklow (R)
| Resigned January 20, 2004 because of a December 2003 felony conviction in relation to a traffic accident.A special election was held June 1, 2004.
|  | Stephanie Herseth (D)
| June 1, 2004

|-
| 
|  | Frank Ballance (D)
| Resigned June 9, 2004 as a result of health problems.A special election was held July 20, 2004
|  | G. K. Butterfield (D)
| July 20, 2004

|-
| 
|  |  (D)
| Switched parties August 9, 2004
|  |  (R)
| August 9, 2004

|-
| 
|  | Doug Bereuter (R)
| Resigned August 31, 2004 to head the Asia Foundation.
| colspan=2 | Remained vacant until the next Congress.

|-
| 
|  | Porter Goss (R)
| Resigned September 23, 2004 to head the CIA.
| colspan=2 | Remained vacant until the next Congress.

|-
| 
|  | Bob Matsui (D)
| Died January 1, 2005
| colspan=2 | Remained vacant until the next Congress.

|}

Committees

Senate 

 Aging (Special) (Larry E. Craig, Chair; John Breaux, Vice Chair) 
 Agriculture, Nutrition and Forestry (Thad Cochran, Chair; Tom Harkin, Ranking Member)
 Forestry, Conservation and Rural Revitalization (Mike Crapo, Chair; Blanche Lincoln, Ranking Member)
 Marketing, Inspection and Product Promotion (Jim Talent, Chair; Max Baucus, Ranking Member)
 Production and Price Competitiveness (Elizabeth Dole, Chair; Kent Conrad, Ranking Member)
 Research, Nutrition and General Legislation (Peter Fitzgerald, Chair; Patrick Leahy, Ranking Member)
 Appropriations (Ted Stevens, Chair; Robert C. Byrd, Ranking Member)
 Agriculture, Rural Development and Related Agencies (Robert F. Bennett, Chair; Herb Kohl, Ranking Member)
 Commerce, Justice, State and the Judiciary (Judd Gregg, Chair; Ernest F. Hollings, Ranking Member)
 Defense (Ted Stevens, Chair; Daniel K. Inouye, Ranking Member)
 District of Columbia (Mike DeWine, Chair; Mary Landrieu, Ranking Member)
 Energy and Water Development (Pete Domenici, Chair; Harry Reid, Ranking Member)
 Foreign Operations (Mitch McConnell, Chair; Patrick Leahy, Ranking Member)
 Homeland Security (Thad Cochran, Chair; Robert C. Byrd, Ranking Member)
 Interior (Conrad Burns, Chair; Byron Dorgan, Ranking Member)
 Labor, Health, Human Services and Education (Arlen Specter, Chair; Tom Harkin, Ranking Member)
 Legislative Branch (Ben Nighthorse Campbell, Chair; Richard J. Durbin, Ranking Member)
 Military Construction (Kay Bailey Hutchison, Chair; Dianne Feinstein, Ranking Member)
 Transportation/Treasury and General Government (Richard Shelby, Chair; Patty Murray, Ranking Member)
 VA, HUD and Independent Agencies (Kit Bond, Chair; Barbara A. Mikulski, Ranking Member)
 Armed Services (John Warner, Chair; Carl Levin, Ranking Member)
 Airland (Jeff Sessions, Chair; Joe Lieberman, Ranking Member)
 Emerging Threats and Capabilities (Pat Roberts, Chair; Jack Reed, Ranking Member)
 Personnel (Saxby Chambliss, Chair; Ben Nelson, Ranking Member)
 Readiness and Management Support (John Ensign, Chair; Daniel Akaka, Ranking Member)
 Seapower (Jim Talent, Chair; Edward M. Kennedy, Ranking Member)
 Strategic Forces (Wayne Allard, Chair; Bill Nelson, Ranking Member)
 Banking, Housing and Urban Affairs (Richard Shelby, Chair; Paul Sarbanes, Ranking Member)
 Economic Policy (Jim Bunning, Chair; Chuck Schumer, Ranking Member)
 Financial Institutions (Robert F. Bennett, Chair; Tim Johnson, Ranking Member)
 Housing and Transportation (Wayne Allard, Chair; Jack Reed, Ranking Member)
 International Trade and Finance (Chuck Hagel, Chair; Evan Bayh, Ranking Member)
 Securities and Investment (Mike Enzi, Chair; Chris Dodd, Ranking Member)
 Budget (Don Nickles, Chair; Kent Conrad, Ranking Member)
 Commerce, Science and Transportation (John McCain, Chair; Ernest F. Hollings, Ranking Member)
 Aviation (Trent Lott, Chair; Ernest F. Hollings, Ranking Member)
 Communications (Conrad Burns, Chair; Ernest F. Hollings, Ranking Member)
 Competition, Foreign Commerce and Infrastructure (Gordon Smith, Chair; Byron L. Dorgan, Ranking Member)
 Consumer Affairs and Product Safety (Peter Fitzgerald, Chair; Ron Wyden, Ranking Member)
 Oceans, Fisheries and Coast Guard (Olympia J. Snowe, Chair; Ernest F. Hollings, Ranking Member)
 Science, Technology and Space (Sam Brownback, Chair; John Breaux, Ranking Member)
 Surface Transportation and Merchant Marine (Kay Bailey Hutchison, Chair; Daniel Inouye, Ranking Member)
 Energy and Natural Resources (Pete Domenici, Chair; Jeff Bingaman, Ranking Member)
 Energy (Lamar Alexander, Chair; Bob Graham, Ranking Member)
 National Parks (Craig Thomas, Chair; Daniel Akaka, Ranking Member)
 Public Lands and Forests (Larry E. Craig, Chair; Ron Wyden, Ranking Member)
 Water and Power (Lisa Murkowski, Chair; Byron Dorgan, Ranking Member)
 Environment and Public Works (Jim Inhofe, Chair; Jim Jeffords, Ranking Member)
 Clean Air, Wetlands, Private Property and Nuclear Safety (George Voinovich, Chair; Tom Carper, Ranking Member)
 Fisheries, Wildlife, and Drinking Water (Mike Crapo, Chair; Bob Graham, Ranking Member)
 Superfund and Waste Management (Lincoln Chafee, Chair; Barbara Boxer, Ranking Member)
 Transportation and Infrastructure (Kit Bond, Chair; Harry Reid, Ranking Member)
 Ethics (Select) (George V. Voinovich, Chair; Harry Reid, Vice Chair)
 Finance (Chuck Grassley, Chair; Max Baucus, Ranking Member)
 Health Care (Jon Kyl, Chair; John D. Rockefeller IV, Ranking Member)
 International Trade (Craig Thomas, Chair; Max Baucus, Ranking Member)
 Long-Term Growth and Debt Reduction (Gordon H. Smith, Chair; Bob Graham, Ranking Member)
 Social Security and Family Policy (Rick Santorum, Chair; John B. Breaux, Ranking Member)
 Taxation and IRS Oversight (Don Nickles, Chair; Kent Conrad, Ranking Member)
 Foreign Relations (Richard Lugar, Chair; Joe Biden, Ranking Member) 
 African Affairs (Lamar Alexander, Chair; Russ Feingold, Ranking Member) 
 East Asian and Pacific Affairs (Sam Brownback, Chair; John Kerry, Ranking Member) 
 European Affairs (George Allen, Chair; Joe Biden, Ranking Member) 
 International Economic Policy, Export and Trade Promotion (Chuck Hagel, Chair; Paul Sarbanes, Ranking Member) 
 International Operations and Terrorism (John E. Sununu, Chair; Bill Nelson, Ranking Member) 
 Near Eastern and South Asian Affairs (Lincoln Chafee, Chair; Barbara Boxer, Ranking Member) 
 Western Hemisphere, Peace Corps, and Narcotics Affairs (Norm Coleman, Chair; Chris Dodd, Vice Chair)
 Governmental Affairs (Susan M. Collins, Chair; Joe Lieberman, Ranking Member) 
 Oversight of Government Management, the Federal Workforce and the District of Columbia (George V. Voinovich, Chair; Richard Durbin, Ranking Member) 
 Financial Management, the Budget and International Security (Peter G. Fitzgerald, Chair; Daniel Akaka, Ranking Member) 
 Permanent Subcommittee on Investigations (Norm Coleman, Chair; Carl Levin, Ranking Member) 
 Indian Affairs (Select) (Ben Nighthorse Campbell, Chair; Daniel K. Inouye, Vice Chair) 
 Intelligence (Select) (Pat Roberts, Chair; John D. Rockefeller IV, Vice Chair)
 Health, Education, Labor and Pensions (Judd Gregg, Chair; Edward M. Kennedy, Ranking Member) 
 Children and Families (Lamar Alexander, Chair; Chris Dodd, Ranking Member) 
 Substance Abuse and Mental Health Services (Mike DeWine, Chair; Edward Kennedy, Ranking Member) 
 Aging (Kit Bond, Chair; Barbara A. Mikulski, Ranking Member) 
 Employment, Safety and Training (Mike Enzi, Chair; Patty Murray, Ranking Member) 
 Judiciary (Orrin G. Hatch, Chair; Patrick Leahy, Ranking Member) 
 Administrative Oversight and the Courts (Jeff Sessions, Chair; Chuck Schumer, Ranking Member) 
 Antitrust, Competition Policy and Consumer Rights (Mike DeWine, Chair; Edward M. Kennedy, Ranking Member) 
 Constitution, Civil Rights and Property Rights (John Cornyn, Chair; Russ Feingold, Ranking Member) 
 Crime, Corrections and Victims' Rights (Lindsey Graham, Chair; Joe Biden, Ranking Member) 
 Immigration, Border Security and Citizenship (Saxby Chambliss, Chair; Edward M. Kennedy, Ranking Member) 
 Terrorism, Technology and Homeland Security (Jon Kyl, Chair; Dianne Feinstein, Ranking Member) 
 Rules and Administration (Trent Lott, Chair; Chris Dodd, Ranking Member) 
 Small Business and Entrepreneurship (Olympia J. Snowe, Chair; John Kerry, Ranking Member) 
 Veterans' Affairs (Arlen Specter, Chair; Bob Graham, Ranking Member)

House of Representatives 

 Agriculture (Bob Goodlatte, Chair; John Boehner, Vice Chair)
 Conservation, Credit and Rural Development (Frank D. Lucas, Chair; Tom Osborne, Vice Chair)
 Department Operations, Oversight, Nutrition and Forestry (Gil Gutknecht, Chair; Dennis Rehberg, Vice Chair)
 General Farm Commodities and Risk Management (Jerry Moran, Chair; Nick Smith, Vice Chair)
 Livestock and Horticulture (Robin Hayes, Chair; Doug Ose, Vice Chair)
 Specialty Crops and Foreign Agriculture Programs (William L. Jenkins, Chair; Terry Everett, Vice Chair)
 Appropriations (Bill Young, Chair; Dave Obey, Ranking Member)
 Agriculture, Rural Development, Food and Drug Administration and Related Agencies (Henry Bonilla, Chair; Marcy Kaptur, Ranking Member)
 Commerce, Justice, State and the Judiciary (Frank R. Wolf, Chair; Jose E. Serrano, Ranking Member)
 Defense (Jerry Lewis, Chair; John Murtha, Ranking Member)
 District of Columbia (Rodney P. Frelinghuysen, Chair; Chaka Fattah, Ranking Member)
 Energy and Water Development (David L. Hobson, Chair; Pete Visclosky, Ranking Member)
 Foreign Operations, Export Financing and Related Programs (Jim Kolbe, Chair; Nita Lowey, Ranking Member)
 Homeland Security (Hal Rogers, Chair; Martin Olav Sabo, Ranking Member)
 Interior (Charles H. Taylor, Chair; Norm Dicks, Ranking Member)
 Legislative (Jack Kingston, Chair; Jim Moran, Ranking Member)
 Military Construction (Joe Knollenberg, Chair; Chet Edwards, Ranking Member) 
 Transportation, Treasury and Independent Agencies (Ernest J. Istook Jr., Chair; John Olver, Ranking Member)
 VA, HUD and Independent Agencies (James T. Walsh, Chair; Alan Mollohan, Ranking Member)
 Armed Services (Duncan Hunter, Chair; Ike Skelton, Ranking Member)
 Projection Forces (Roscoe G. Bartlett, Chair; Gene Taylor, Ranking Member)
 Readiness (Joel Hefley, Chair; Solomon P. Ortiz, Ranking Member)
 Strategic Forces (Terry Everett, Chair; Silvestre Reyes, Ranking Member)
 Tactical Air and Land Forces (Curt Weldon, Chair; Neil Abercrombie, Ranking Member)
 Terrorism, Unconventional Threats and Capabilities (Jim Saxton, Chair; Marty Meehan, Ranking Member)
 Total Force (John M. McHugh, Chair; Vic Snyder, Ranking Member)
 Budget (Jim Nussle, Chair; John M. Spratt Jr., Ranking Member)
 Education and the Workforce (John Boehner, Chair; George Miller, Ranking Member)
 Education Reform (Michael Castle, Chair; Lynn Woolsey, Ranking Member)
 Employer-Employee Relations (Sam Johnson, Chair; Robert E. Andrews, Ranking Member)
 Select Education (Peter Hoekstra, Chair; Ruben Hinojosa, Ranking Member)
 Workforce Protections (Charlie Norwood, Chair; Major Owens, Ranking Member)
 21st Century Competitiveness (Buck McKeon, Chair; Dale Kildee, Ranking Member)
 Energy and Commerce (Billy Tauzin, Chair; Richard Burr, Vice Chair)
 Commerce, Trade and Consumer Protection (Cliff Stearns, Chair; John B. Shadegg, Vice Chair)
 Energy and Air Quality (Joe Barton, Chair; John Shimkus, Vice Chair)
 Environment and Hazardous Materials (Paul E. Gillmor, Chair; Vito Fossella, Vice Chair)
 Health (Michael Bilirakis, Chair; Charlie Norwood, Vice Chair)
 Oversight and Investigations (James C. Greenwood, Chair; Greg Walden, Vice Chair) 
 Telecommunications and the Internet (Fred Upton, Chair; Cliff Stearns, Vice Chair)
 Financial Services (Mike Oxley, Chair; Barney Frank, Ranking Member)
 Capital Markets, Insurance and Government-Sponsored Enterprises (Richard H. Baker, Chair; Paul Kanjorski, Ranking Member)
 Domestic and International Monetary Policy, Trade and Technology (Peter T. King, Chair; Carolyn Maloney, Ranking Member)
 Financial Institutions and Consumer Credit (Spencer Bachus, Chair; Bernie Sanders, Ranking Member)
 Housing and Community Opportunity (Bob Ney, Chair; Maxine Waters, Ranking Member)
 Oversight and Investigations (Sue W. Kelly, Chair; Luis Guiterrez, Ranking Member) 
 Government Reform (Thomas Davis, Chair; Henry Waxman, Ranking Member)
 Civil Service and Agency Organization (Jo Ann Davis, Chair; Danny K. Davis, Ranking Member)
 Criminal Justice, Drug Policy and Human Resources (Mark Souder, Chair; Elijah E. Cummings, Ranking Member)
 Energy Policy, Natural Resources and Regulatory Affairs (Doug Ose, Chair; John Tierney, Ranking Member)
 Government Efficiency and Financial Management (Todd R. Platts, Chair; Edolphus Towns, Ranking Member)
 Human Rights and Wellness (Dan Burton, Chair; Diane Watson, Ranking Member)
 National Security, Emerging Threats and International Relations (Christopher Shays, Chair; Dennis J. Kucinich, Ranking Member)
 Technology, Information Policy, Intergovernmental Relations and the Census (Adam Putnam, Chair; William Lacy Clay, Ranking Member)
 House Administration (Bob Ney, Chair; John B. Larson, Ranking Member)
 International Relations (Henry J. Hyde, Chair; Tom Lantos, Ranking Member)
 Africa (Ed Royce, Chair; Donald Payne, Ranking Member)
 Asia and the Pacific (Jim Leach, Chair; Eni Faleomavaega, Ranking Member)
 Europe (Doug Bereuter, Chair; Robert Wexler, Ranking Member)
 International Terrorism, Nonproliferation and Human Rights (Elton Gallegly, Chair; Brad Sherman, Ranking Member)
 The Middle East and Central Asia (Ileana Ros-Lehtinen, Chair; Gary Ackerman, Ranking Member)
 The Western Hemisphere (Cass Ballenger, Chair; Robert Menendez, Ranking Member)
 Judiciary (Jim Sensenbrenner, Chair; John Conyers, Ranking Member)
 Commercial and Administrative Law (Chris Cannon, Chair; Mel Watt, Ranking Member)
 The Constitution (Steve Chabot, Chair; Jerrold Nadler, Ranking Member)
 Courts, The Internet and Intellectual Property (Lamar S. Smith, Chair; Howard Berman, Ranking Member)
 Crime, Terrorism and Homeland Security (Howard Coble, Chair; Bobby Scott, Ranking Member)
 Immigration, Border Security and Claims (John Hostettler, Chair; Sheila Jackson Lee, Ranking Member)
 Resources (Richard Pombo, Chair; Jim Gibbons, Vice Chair)
 Energy and Mineral Resources (Barbara Cubin, Chair; Ron Kind, Ranking Member)
 Fisheries Conservation, Wildlife and Oceans (Wayne T. Gilchrest, Chair; Frank Pallone Jr., Ranking Member)
 Forests and Forest Health (Scott McInnis, Chair; Jay Inslee, Ranking Member)
 National Parks, Recreation and Public Lands (George P. Radanovich, Chair; Donna Christian-Christensen, Ranking Member)
 Water and Power (Ken Calvert, Chair; Grace Napolitano, Ranking Member)
 Rules (David Dreier, Chair; Porter Goss, Vice Chair)
 The Legislative Process (Deborah Pryce, Chair; Lincoln Diaz-Balart, Vice Chair)
 Technology and the House (John Linder, Chair; Sue W. Myrick, Vice Chair)
 Science (Sherwood Boehlert, Chair; Ralph M. Hall, Ranking Member)
 Energy (Judy Biggert, Chair; Nick Lampson, Ranking Member)
 Environment, Technology and Standards (Vernon Ehlers, Chair; Mark Udall, Ranking Member)
 Research (Nick Smith, Chair; Eddie Bernice Johnson, Ranking Member)
 Space and Aeronautics (Dana Rohrabacher, Chair; Bart Gordon, Ranking Member)
 Small Business (Donald A. Manzullo, Chair; Nydia Velazquez, Ranking Member)
 Regulatory Reform and Oversight (Edward L. Schrock, Chair; Charles A. Gonzalez, Ranking Member)
 Rural Enterprises, Agriculture and Technology (Sam Graves, Chair; Frank Ballance, Ranking Member)
 Tax, Finance and Exports (Patrick J. Toomey, Chair; Juanita Millender-McDonald, Ranking Member)
 Workforce, Empowerment and Government Programs (W. Todd Akin, Chair; Tom Udall, Ranking Member)
 Standards of Official Conduct (Joel Hefley, Chair; Alan B. Mollohan, Ranking Member)
 Transportation and Infrastructure (Don Young, Chair; Jim Oberstar, Ranking Member)
 Aviation (John Mica, Chair; Peter A. DeFazio, Ranking Member)
 Coast Guard and Maritime Transportation (Frank A. LoBiondo, Chair; Bob Filner, Ranking Member)
 Economic Development, Public Buildings and Emergency Management (Steve LaTourette, Chair; Eleanor Holmes Norton, Ranking Member)
 Highways, Transit and Pipelines (Tom Petri, Chair; Bill Lipinski, Ranking Member)
 Railroads (Jack Quinn, Chair; Corrine Brown, Ranking Member)
 Water Resources and Environment (John J. Duncan Jr., Chair; Jerry F. Costello, Ranking Member)
 Veterans' Affairs (Chris Smith, Chair; Lane Evans, Ranking Member)
 Benefits (Henry E. Brown Jr., Chair; Michael Michaud, Ranking Member)
 Health (Rob Simmons, Chair; Ciro Rodriguez, Ranking Member) 
 Oversight and Investigations (Steve Buyer, Chair; Darlene Hooley, Ranking Member)
 Ways and Means (Bill Thomas, Chair; Charles Rangel, Ranking Member)
 Health (Nancy Johnson, Chair; Pete Stark, Ranking Member)
 Human Resources (Wally Herger, Chair; Ben Cardin, Ranking Member)
 Oversight (Amo Houghton, Chair; Earl Pomeroy, Ranking Member)
 Select Revenue Measures (Jim McCrery, Chair; Michael McNulty, Ranking Member)
 Social Security (E. Clay Shaw Jr., Chair; Bob Matsui, Ranking Member)
 Trade (Phil Crane, Chair; Sander Levin, Ranking Member)
 Whole

Joint committees

 Economic (Sen. Robert F. Bennett, Chair; Rep. Jim Saxton, Vice Chair)
 Taxation (Rep. Bill Thomas, Chair; Sen. Chuck Grassley, Vice Chair)
 The Library (Sen. Ted Stevens, Chair; Rep. Vernon J. Ehlers, Vice Chair)
 Printing (Rep. Bob Ney, Chair; Sen. Saxby Chambliss, Vice Chair)

Caucuses

Employees

Legislative branch agency directors
 Architect of the Capitol: Alan M. Hantman
 Attending Physician of the United States Congress: John F. Eisold
 Comptroller General of the United States: David M. Walker
 Director of the Congressional Budget Office: Barry B. Anderson, until February 5, 2003 
 Douglas Holtz-Eakin, from February 5, 2003
 Librarian of Congress: James H. Billington
 Public Printer of the United States: Bruce James

Senate
 Chaplain: Lloyd John Ogilvie (Presbyterian), until March 15, 2003
 Barry C. Black (Seventh-day Adventist), from July 7, 2003
 Curator: Diane K. Skvarla
 Historian: Richard A. Baker
 Parliamentarian: Alan S. Frumin
 Secretary: Emily J. Reynolds
 Librarian: Greg Harness
 Secretary for the Majority: David J. Schiappa
 Secretary for the Minority: Martin P. Paone
 Sergeant at Arms: Alfonso E. Lenhardt, until March 17, 2003
 William H. Pickle, from March 17, 2003

House of Representatives
Employees include:
 Chaplain: Daniel P. Coughlin (Roman Catholic)
 Chief Administrative Officer: James M. Eagen III
 Clerk: Jeff Trandahl
 Inspector General: Steven McNamara
 Parliamentarian: Charles W. Johnson III, until May 31, 2004
 John V. Sullivan, from May 31, 2004
 Reading Clerks: Mary Kevin Niland (Democratic); Paul Hays (Republican)
 Sergeant at Arms: Wilson Livingood

See also

Elections
 2002 United States elections (elections leading to this Congress)
 2002 United States Senate elections
 2002 United States House of Representatives elections
 2004 United States elections (elections during this Congress, leading to the next Congress)
 2004 United States presidential election
 2004 United States Senate elections
 2004 United States House of Representatives elections

Membership lists
 List of new members of the 108th United States Congress

Notes

References

External links
 Biographical Directory of the U.S. Congress
 Congress.gov
 History, Art and Archives from the United States House of Representatives
 Statistics & Lists from the United States Senate
 United States 108th Congress Web Archive from the U.S. Library of Congress